Elena Roca Moro (born 1 July 1976) is a Spanish rugby union player. She was a member of the Spain women's national rugby union team.

Career 
She competed at the 2006 Women's Rugby World Cup, 2012 end-of-year women's rugby union tests, and 2013 Women's European Qualification Tournament.

She played centre position (12 or 13) with Universidad Coruña club.

She is coach with  Coruña Rugby Club .

References

External links 
 prende a cociñar na Coruña con Elena Roca. 22-06-2021

1976 births
Spanish rugby union players
Living people